A snap election is an election that is called earlier than the one that has been scheduled.

Generally, a snap election in a parliamentary system (the dissolution of parliament) is called to capitalize on an unusual electoral opportunity or to decide a pressing issue, under circumstances when an election is not required by law or convention. A snap election differs from a recall election in that it is initiated by politicians (usually the head of government or ruling party) rather than voters, and from a by-election in that a completely new parliament is chosen as opposed to merely filling vacancies in an already established assembly. Early elections can also be called in certain jurisdictions after a ruling coalition is dissolved if a replacement coalition cannot be formed within a constitutionally set time limit.

Since the power to call snap elections (the dissolution of parliament) usually lies with the incumbent, they often result in increased majorities for the party already in power provided they have been called at an advantageous time. However, snap elections can also backfire on the incumbent resulting in a decreased majority or in some cases the opposition winning or gaining power. As a result of the latter cases, there have been occasions in which the consequence has been the implementation of fixed-term elections.

Americas

Belize
According to Section 84 of the Constitution of Belize, the National Assembly must be dissolved "five years from the date when the two Houses of the former National Assembly first met" unless dissolved sooner by the governor-general upon the advice of the prime minister.

Since Belize gained independence from the British Empire in September 1981, snap elections have been called twice, in 1993 and 2012. In March 2015, Belizean Prime Minister Dean Barrow ruled out the possibility of a snap election later in the year. In the November 2015 general election, Prime Minister Barrow's United Democratic Party increased its majority by 9 percent as it made Belizean history, forming its third consecutive government.

Canada

In Canada, snap elections at the federal level are very common. Section 50 of the Constitution Act, 1867 and section 4 of the Canadian Charter of Rights and Freedoms limits the maximum life of a federal parliament to five years following the return of the last writs of election. A law was passed to set the election date on the third Monday in October in the fourth calendar year after the previous poll, although courts found it effectively legally unenforceable and not binding on the prime minister. Any election that occurs before the schedule is a snap election.

During his 10 years as prime minister, Jean Chrétien recommended to the governor general to call two snap elections, in 1997 and 2000, winning both times.  Wilfrid Laurier and John Turner, meanwhile, both lost their premierships in snap elections they themselves had called (in 1911 and 1984, respectively).  The most notable federal snap election is that of 1958, where Prime Minister John Diefenbaker called an election just nine months after the previous one and transformed his minority government into the largest majority in the history of Canada up to that date.

A snap election was also called in the province of Ontario in 1990, three years into Premier David Peterson's term.  Peterson was polling at 54%, lower than his peak popularity but still well above the opposition party leaders, and expected to be re-elected with comfortable majority.  However, the 1990 Ontario general election backfired since it was interpreted as a sign of arrogance, with some cynically viewing it as an attempt to win another mandate before an anticipated economic recession. In the biggest upset in Ontario history, the Ontario New Democratic Party led by Bob Rae won an unprecedented majority government while Peterson lost his own seat to a rookie NDP candidate. A similar result occurred in Alberta in 2015 when Premier Jim Prentice of the governing Progressive Conservative Association of Alberta called a snap election. A few months before, 11 MLAs including their leader from the official opposition Wildrose Party had crossed the floor to sit with the government. However, the province was entering an economic recession due to the abrupt 2010s oil glut, and Prentice's budget was not well received by either the political left or right. The resulting Alberta New Democratic Party majority victory unseated 13 cabinet ministers and ended 44 years of Progressive Conservative government in Alberta.

In 2021, sitting Liberal Prime Minister Justin Trudeau called a snap election in an attempt to win a majority, up from his previous minority government. He justified the snap election as a way for Canadians to choose which government leads them through Canada's recovery from the COVID-19 pandemic. However, Trudeau was widely criticized for calling the snap election while the country was in the midst of a 4th wave of Covid. Following the election Trudeau managed to remain Prime Minister, but the Liberal Party failed to win a majority government.

Peru

The Constitution of Peru allows for the dissolution of Congress by the President if a vote of no-confidence is passed two times by the legislative body, who then has four months to call for new parliamentary elections or faces impeachment. The 2020 Peruvian parliamentary elections were declared after President Martín Vizcarra dissolved Congress.

Asia and Oceania

Australia
There are three procedures in which elections can be held early in Australia:
 The maximum term of the Australian House of Representatives is 3 years. However, the chamber can wait several months after the election to make its first sitting, while a campaign period of at least 33 days is needed between the dates that the election is called and held. It is the norm for the chamber to be dissolved early by the Governor-General before its term expires, which is done on the advice of the Prime Minister.
 Half of the Australian Senate (excluding the seats representing territories) changes over every three years in July. An election for the half about to change over must take place up to a year before this is due, on a date determined by the government. By convention, the elections of both chambers have usually been held on the same day. If the previous Senate election was held close to the changeover, the next Senate election can be held significantly earlier.
 A Double dissolution may be called to resolve conflict between the two chambers, in which case the entire membership of both chambers comes up for election. This requires at least one bill that originated in the House of Representatives (often called a "trigger") to be rejected twice by the Senate under certain conditions. In this case, the next Senate changeover is due in the second month of July after the election, while the House of Representatives begins a new 3-year term.

Examples of early  elections in Australia:
 1963 election: Liberal Prime Minister Robert Menzies called an early election for the House of Representatives because the government were struggling to govern with their narrow 2-seat majority in the chamber. The government succeeded in gaining 10 seats. The election left the House and Senate elections out of synchronization until 1974.
 1974 election: The double dissolution election focused on Labor Prime Minister Gough Whitlam's first one-and-a-half years in office and whether the Australian public was willing to continue with his reform agenda, and also to break a deadlock in the Senate after Opposition Leader Billy Snedden announced that the opposition would block the Government's supply bills in the Senate following the Gair Affair. The Whitlam government was subsequently returned with a reduced majority in the House of Representatives but increased presence (but no majority) in the Senate, allowing the government to pass six reform bills in a joint sitting of the two houses of the Australian parliament.
 1975 election: The election followed the controversial dismissal of the Whitlam government by Governor-General Sir John Kerr in the 1975 constitutional crisis and the installation of Opposition Leader Malcolm Fraser as prime minister. Labor believed it had a chance of winning the elections, and that the dismissal would be an electoral asset for them but the Coalition attacked Labor for the economic conditions they presided over, resulting in the Coalition winning a record victory, with 91 seats in the House of Representatives to the ALP's 36 and a 35–27 majority in the expanded Senate.
 1983 election: While an election was not due for seven more months, Malcolm Fraser had been emboldened by the unexpected victory in a 1982 by election which his Liberal Party was expected to lose. Fraser also sought to exploit divisions in the opposition Labor Party, and was surprised to learn that the popular Bob Hawke had won the Labor Party leadership on the day he sought a dissolution. Ultimately, Labor won power and defeated the Fraser government on a 24-seat swing—the largest defeat of a sitting government since 1949, and the worst defeat a sitting non-Labor government has ever suffered. 
 1984 election: This election was held 18 months ahead of time in order to bring the elections for the House of Representatives and Senate back into line. They had been thrown out of balance by the double dissolution of 1983. It was widely expected that the incumbent Hawke Labor government would be easily re-elected, but an exceptionally long 10-week campaign, confusion over the ballot papers and a strong campaign performance by Liberal leader, Andrew Peacock, saw the government's majority reduced (although this was disguised by the increase in the size of the House from 125 to 148).
 1998 election: The election on 3 October 1998 was held six months earlier than required by the Constitution. Prime Minister John Howard made the announcement following the launch of the coalition's Goods and Services Tax (GST) policy launch and a five-week advertising campaign. The ensuing election was almost entirely dominated by the proposed 10% GST and proposed income tax cuts.
 2010 election: A federal election was held on Saturday, 21 August 2010, which was called relatively early in order to give Prime Minister Gillard - who had won the prime ministership outside of an election from Kevin Rudd - a greater mandate. The election ended in a hung parliament, and a resultant retaining of Labor's majority in the House of Representatives after negotiations with independents and the Australian Greens.

Bangladesh
After Khaleda Zia's Bangladesh Nationalist Party five-year term ended in January 1996, the country went to the polls on 15 February 1996, where elections were boycotted by all major opposition parties including BNP'S arch-rival Sheikh Hasina's Awami League. The opposition had demanded a neutral caretaker government to oversee the polls, but it was rejected by the incumbent government and the election went on as scheduled. The BNP won by default, grabbing all the 300 seats in the Jatiya Sangsad and assumed power. The Awami League and its allies did not accept the results and called a month-long general strike and blockades to overthrow the BNP government. The general strike was marred by bloody violence including a grenade attack on Awami League's headquarters which killed scores of people. On the other hand, the Supreme Court of Bangladesh annulled the election results which forced the BNP government to amend the constitution in a special parliamentary session by introducing the Caretaker government system as a part of the electoral reform. Eventually the BNP government was toppled and ousted when they resigned on 31 March 1996, and handed over power to the caretaker government. The caretaker government stayed in power for 90 days before new elections could be held. Finally a snap election was held on 12 June 1996, where Awami-League won a simple majority by beating its bitter rival BNP and stayed in power for the next five years.

India
 1998 general election: General elections were held in India in 1998, after the government elected in 1996 collapsed and the 12th Lok Sabha was convened. New elections were called when Indian National Congress (INC) left the United Front government led by I.K. Gujral, after they refused to drop the regional Dravida Munnetra Kazhagam (DMK) party from the government after the DMK was linked by an investigative panel to Sri Lankan separatists blamed for the assassination of Rajiv Gandhi. The outcome of the new elections was also indecisive, with no party or alliance able to create a strong majority. Although the Bharatiya Janata Party's Atal Bihari Vajpayee retained his position of prime minister getting support from 286 members out of 545, the government collapsed again in late 1998 when the All India Anna Dravida Munnetra Kazhagam, with its 18 seats, withdrew their support, leading to new elections in 1999.
 1999 general election: General elections were held in India from 5 September to 3 October 1999, a few months after the Kargil War. The 13th Lok Sabha election is of historical importance as it was the first time a united front of parties managed to attain a majority and form a government that lasted a full term of five years, thus ending a period of political instability at the national level that had been characterised by three general elections held in as many years.

On 17 April 1999, the Bharatiya Janata Party (BJP) coalition government led by Prime Minister Atal Bihari Vajpayee failed a to win a confidence vote in the Lok Sabha (India's lower house), falling short a single vote due to the withdrawal of one of the government's coalition partners – the All India Anna Dravida Munnetra Kazhagam (AIADMK). The leader of the AIADMK, J. Jayalalitha, had consistently threatened to withdraw support from the ruling coalition if certain demands were not met, in particular the sacking of the Tamil Nadu government, control of which she had lost three years prior. The BJP accused Jayalalitha of making the demands in order to avoid standing trial for a series of corruption charges, and no agreement between the parties could be reached leading to the government's defeat.

Sonia Gandhi, as leader of the opposition and largest opposition party (Indian National Congress) was unable to form a coalition of parties large enough to secure a working majority in the Lok Sabha. Thus shortly after the no confidence motion, President K. R. Narayanan dissolved the Parliament and called fresh elections. Atal Bihari Vajpayee remained caretaker prime minister till the elections were held later that year.

Israel 

After the legislative election in April 2019 resulted in a political stalemate after Yisrael Beiteinu refused to join a Likud-led governing coalition, on the day transitional prime minister Benjamin Netanyahu's mandate for coalition formation ended, the Knesset voted to dissolve itself (preventing president Reuven Rivlin from transferring the mandate for coalition formation to the second-largest party Blue and White's leader, Benny Gantz, with respect to the process defined by the law). Thus, a snap legislative election was called, which resulted in a similar stalemate. After both Likud and Blue and White failed to form a coalition, a third consecutive snap election resulted in yet another stalemate. Progress has been made due to the COVID-19 pandemic, and consequently the thirty-fifth government of Israel was formed. However, another snap election was held in 2021 after collapse of the coalition government.

Japan
In Japan, a snap election is called when a prime minister dissolves the lower house of the Diet of Japan. The act is based on Article 7 of the Constitution of Japan, which can be interpreted as saying that the prime minister has the power to dissolve the lower house after so advising the Emperor. Almost all general elections of the lower house have been snap elections since 1947, when the current constitution was enacted. The only exception was 1976 election, when the Prime Minister Takeo Miki was isolated within his own Liberal Democratic Party. The majority of LDP politicians opposed Miki's decision not to dissolve the lower house until the end of its 4-year term.

Kazakhstan 
Nationally, general elections in Kazakhstan are held every five years. According to the Constitutional Law, the President may call a snap election both for parliamentary and presidential races and must held no later than two months respectively after which they are called.

 Virtually every presidential election in Kazakhstan since independence had been held ahead of schedule in 1999, 2005, 2011, 2015, 2019, and 2022. In which the reasoning behind for consecutive snap elections were due to economic and political factors with allegations for the Kazakh leadership to systemically maintain its grip on power while leaving the opposition consolidated.
 Snap parliamentary elections have also become more frequent in Kazakhstan. Originally the 1994 legislative elections were held as a result of the dissolution of the Supreme Soviet which previously consisted of former Communist Party MPs and paved way for a multi-party system. However due to the nature of the newly Supreme Council opposing then-President Nursultan Nazarbayev, it was dissolved a year later and were followed by 1995 legislative elections which saw pro-Nazarbayev candidates becoming MPs. Snap elections took place in 2007, 2012, and 2016 under the pretext of economic issues.

New Zealand
New Zealand elections must be held every three years, and the date is determined by the prime minister. There have been three snap elections, in 1951, 1984 and 2002.
 The 1951 snap election occurred immediately after the 1951 waterfront dispute, in which the National Party government sided with shipping companies against a militant union, while the Labour opposition equivocated and thus annoyed both sides. The government was returned with an increased majority.
 The 1984 snap election occurred during a term in which the National Party government had a majority of only one seat. Prime Minister Robert Muldoon lost patience with his less obedient MPs and called an election, announcing it on television while visibly drunk. Muldoon's government subsequently lost and the Labour Party took power.
 The 2002 election. On 12 June 2002 the Labour Party Prime Minister Helen Clark announced that the country would have a general election on 27 July 2002. Clark claimed that an early poll was necessary due to the collapse of her junior coalition partner, the Alliance, but denied it was a snap election. This early election caused considerable comment. Critics claimed that Clark could have continued to govern, and that the early election was called to take advantage of Labour's strong position in the polls. The National Party was caught unprepared by the election and suffered its worst ever result (20.9% of the party vote), and the government was returned with an increased majority.

Pakistan
 1990 general election: The Pakistan Peoples Party (PPP) led by Benazir Bhutto won a plurality of seats in the 1988 election and Bhutto became prime minister. However, by 1990 there was discontent over rising lawlessness, allegations of corruption and the failure of the government to fulfill the promises it had made during the 1988 campaign.
 1993 general election: The Pakistan Muslim League (N) (PML-N) won the 1990 election and the party's leader, Nawaz Sharif, became prime minister. In early 1993 he attempted to strip the president of the power to dismiss the prime minister, National Assembly and regional assemblies. However, in April 1993 President Khan dismissed Sharif for corruption and called elections for 14 July after dissolving the National Assembly. Sharif immediately appealed to the Supreme Court, which in May ruled by 10 to 1 that Khan had exceeded his powers and therefore restored Sharif as prime minister.

Khan and Sharif then began to battle for control of Pakistan for the next two months. They both attempted to secure control over the regional assemblies and in particular, Punjab. In Punjab this saw a staged kidnapping and the moving of 130 members of the Punjab Assembly to the capital to ensure they stayed loyal to Sharif. Meanwhile, the leader of the main opposition party Benazir Bhutto threatened to lead a march on Islamabad unless new elections were called.

Finally on 18 July, under pressure from the army to resolve the power struggle, Sharif and Khan resigned as prime minister and president respectively. Elections for the National Assembly were called for 6 October with elections for the regional assemblies set to follow shortly afterwards.

 1997 general election: The PPP won the largest number of seats in the 1993 election and Benazir Bhutto became prime minister at the head of a coalition government. However, on 5 November 1996, President Leghari, a former ally of Bhutto, dismissed the government 2 years early for alleged corruption and abuse of power. The allegations included financial mismanagement, failing to stop police killings, destroying judicial independence and violating the constitution. A number of PPP party members were detained including Bhutto's husband Asif Ali Zardari who was accused of taking commissions for arranging official deals.

A former speaker and member of the PPP Miraj Khalid was appointed interim prime minister. The National Assembly and provincial assemblies were dissolved and elections called for 3 February 1997. Bhutto denied all the charges against herself and petitioned the Supreme Court to reverse her dismissal. However, the court ruled in January that there was sufficient evidence for the dismissal to be justified legally.

Philippines
The Philippines has used the presidential system with fixed terms more much of its history. This means that Congress cannot be dissolved, and that "snap elections" as understood under the parliamentary system cannot be invoked. However, during the presidency of Ferdinand Marcos, the constitution starting from 1973, and first applied in 1978, placed the country under the semi-presidential system of government, where the Batasang Pambansa (parliament) can be dissolved. During the operation of that constitution, the parliament was not dissolved, but Marcos, who had earlier been elected in 1981 for a six-year term, asked parliament to move the 1987 presidential election to 1986, in response to growing social unrest, political and economic crises, political instability, and deteriorating peace and public order.

In the Philippines, the term "snap election" often refers to the 1986 presidential election. Marcos was self declared the official winner of the election but was eventually ousted when allegations of fraud marred the election. A new constitution approved in 1987 reverted to the presidential system, which made future snap elections unlikely. Fixed presidential elections are held every six years, with legislative elections held every three years.

Thailand
 2006 general election: In 2005,  Prime Minister Thaksin Shinawatra and his Thai Rak Thai Party were re-elected for a second consecutive term in office when they won a landslide general election victory by securing 375 out of 500 seats in parliament. This result gave his party the power to amend the constitution since they won a two-thirds majority. However one year later, in 2006, Thaksin was found to have been indulging in corrupt business practices in his telecommunication firm Shincorp. This led to violent street protests in Bangkok arranged by his rivals, the Democrat party, led by the main opposition leader Abhisit Vejjajiva in which they demanded his resignation. Thaksin took a gamble and called a snap election scheduled for 2 April 2006 where all the main opposition parties boycotted the polls and over 50% of voters chose to not cast their ballots. Thaksin won by default and captured all the 500 seats in the house of parliament. Months later, the supreme court annulled the election results and ordered a fresh election to be held within 100 days from the date of the court's ruling. However, Thaksin was ousted in a bloodless military coup, forcing him into exile in the Philippines and Dubai. The military stayed in power until 2007 when they stepped down and held a general election in December that year to restore democracy.
 2014 general election: Thaksin Shinawatra's sister Yingluck Shinawatra became Thailand's first female prime minister on 3 August 2011 when she won a landslide election victory on 3 July 2011. Peace prevailed in Thailand for the next two and a half years under Prime Minister Yingluck's rule. The country returned to another political crisis in November 2013 when her opponents wanted the prime minister and her Pheu Thai Party government to resign after she tried to pass a controversial amnesty bill in parliament which would permit the return of her brother Thaksin as a free man. However, the bill was not passed because the government succumbed to pressure from weeks of street protests and blockades that took place in Bangkok, which intensified before the King's birthday. On 9 December 2013, Prime Minister Yingluck Shinawatra decided to dissolve parliament and called a snap general election, which was held on 2 February 2014. This announcement came a day after the resignation of all MPs from the main opposition Democrat Party led by opposition leader Abhisit Vejjajiva, which boycotted the election afterwards.

Europe

Armenia
Snap parliamentary elections were held in Armenia on 9 December 2018, as none of the parties in the National Assembly were able to put forward and then elect a candidate for prime minister in the two-week period following the resignation of incumbent Prime Minister Nikol Pashinyan. They were the first elections following the 2018 revolution and the country's first-ever snap elections.

Bulgaria

Snap elections were held in 2014 when neither the Bulgarian Socialist Party nor GERB were able to form a coalition with a tied parliament.

After the 2020–2021 Bulgarian protests there is a political stalemate which led to snap elections in July 2021, November 2021, 2022 (after Petkov Government fell) and 2023.

Czech Republic
Snap general elections were held in the Czech Republic on 25 and 26 October 2013, seven months before the constitutional expiry of the elected parliament's four year legislative term.

The government elected in May 2010 led by Prime Minister Petr Nečas was forced to resign on 17 June 2013, after a corruption and bribery scandal. A caretaker government led by Prime Minister Jiří Rusnok was then appointed by the President, but narrowly lost a vote of confidence on 7 August, leading to its resignation six days later. The Chamber of Deputies then passed a motion dissolving itself on 20 August, with a call for new elections within 60 days after presidential assent. The President gave his assent on 28 August, scheduling the elections for 25 and 26 October 2013.

Denmark
In Denmark, Parliamentary elections take place every fourth year (Danish Constitution art. 32, sec. 1); however, the prime minister can choose to call an early election at any time, provided that any elected parliament has already been called into session at least once.(Danish Constitution art. 32, sec. 2). If a government loses its majority in the Folketing, this is not automatically a vote of confidence, but such a vote may be called, and – if lost – the government calls a new election. Denmark has a history of coalition minority governments, and due to this system, a party normally providing parliamentary support for the sitting government while not being part of it, can choose to deprive the government of a parliamentary majority regarding a specific vote, but at the same time avoid calling new elections since any vote of no confidence takes place as a separate procedure.

Notably, Denmark faced a number of very short parliaments in the 1970s and the 1980s. Prime Minister Poul Schlüter lead a series of coalition minority governments calling elections in both 1984, 1987, 1988 and 1990. Likewise, his predecessors called elections in 1971, 1973, 1975, 1977, 1979 and 1981. For more than 40 years, no Danish parliament has sat its full four-year term, in all cases, the prime minister has called elections at an earlier date.

2007 general election: Danish prime minister Anders Fogh Rasmussen announced an election date for 24 October 2007. The election was held ahead of time in the sense that by law, the election needed to be held before 8 February 2009, four years after the previous election. Anders Fogh Rasmussen explained that the elections were called early in order to allow the parliament to work on important upcoming topics without being distracted by a future election. Referring specifically to welfare reform, he said rival parties would then try to outdo each other with expensive reforms which would damage the Danish economy.

Finland
The President of Finland can call for an early election. As per the version of the 2000 constitution currently in use, the president can do this only upon proposal by the prime minister and after consultations with the parliamentary groups, while the Parliament is in session. In prior versions of the constitution, the President had the power to do this unilaterally.

France
In France, under the Fifth Republic, while the National Assembly is elected for a five-year term, the President has the authority to dissolve the National Assembly and call an early election, provided the Assembly hasn't been dissolved in the preceding twelve months. Since the synchronization of the presidential and parliamentary terms to five years in 2002, reducing the risk of a cohabitation, an early election has not been called.
 1968 Parliamentary Election: The then-president Charles de Gaulle called a snap election after May protests.
 1988 Parliamentary Election: After the re-election of François Mitterrand in that year's presidential election, a snap parliamentary election was called to try and create a parliamentary majority for Mitterrand in order to end the cohabitation government. While his allies obtained a plurality of seats, a coalition government needed to be formed. A similar dissolution occurred in 1981 after Mitterrand's first election.
 1997 Parliamentary Election: The then-president Jacques Chirac called an election one year before it was scheduled to take place in an effort to catch the left-wing parties off guard. Partly due to the unpopularity of the prime minister, Alain Juppé, a coalition of left-wing parties were able to form a government, resulting in the longest cohabitation period in modern French history. This also marks the only time a French president has lost an election he called on his own initiative.

Germany
In the Federal Republic of Germany, elections to the Bundestag must take place within 46–48 months (every four years) after the first sitting of the previous chamber. The Federal President may dissolve the chamber prematurely if the government loses a confidence motion (at the request of the Chancellor), or if no majority government can be formed.
 1972 federal election: Chancellor Willy Brandt's social-liberal coalition between the Social Democratic Party and the Free Democratic Party had been elected in 1969 with a relatively narrow 20-seat majority. The government then lost their majority after several MPs defected to the CDU/CSU opposition due to the government's Ostpolitik foreign policy, especially the recognition of the Oder-Neisse line. Benefitting from Brandt's personal popularity, the government was re-elected with a strengthened majority.
 1983 federal election: The government of Chancellor Helmut Schmidt had been ousted in October 1982 after the FDP had switched from being allied with the SPD  to being allied with the CDU-CSU union. Although the majority of MPs now supported the government of the new Chancellor Helmut Kohl, he called an early election in order to gain an explicit mandate to govern. To do this, he deliberately lost a confidence motion by asking for his coalition MPs to abstain. There was some controversy over this move and the decision was challenged in the Constitutional Court, but given approval. Kohl's government won the election with a net loss of one seat.
 2005 federal election: Chancellor Gerhard Schröder deliberately lost a confidence motion to trigger new elections after a series of state election losses, culminating with North Rhine-Westphalia, caused the opposition to gain a wide majority in the Bundesrat. The red-green coalition government also feared that left-wing SPD MPs were threatening to block legislation. As with the 1983 dissolution, it was challenged and upheld in the Federal Constitutional Court. The election produced a hung parliament due to the gains made by The Left party, resulting in a grand coalition being formed between the CDU-CSU and SPD. Schröder lost his chancellorship to Angela Merkel due to his party narrowly coming second in the elections.

Greece
In 2012, Greece held snap elections in two consecutive months. The government of George Papandreou, elected in the 2009 legislative election, had resigned in November 2011. Instead of triggering an immediate snap election, the government was replaced by a national unity government which had a remit to ratify and implement decisions taken with other Eurozone countries and the International Monetary Fund (IMF) a month earlier. This government served for six months.

The May 2012 legislative election produced a deadlocked parliament and attempts to form a government were unsuccessful. The constitution directs the president to dissolve a newly elected parliament that is unable to form a government. Ten days after the election, the president announced that a second election would be held. The June 2012 legislative election resulted in the formation of a coalition government.

Italy
In Italy, national snap elections have been quite frequent in modern history, both under the Monarchy and in the current republican phase. After the foundation of the Italian Republic in 1946, the first snap election occurred in 1972 and the latest one in 2022. After significant changes in the election system (in 1992–1993), the frequency of snap elections has been slightly reduced since new regulations granted completion of two of four parliamentary terms. Nonetheless, snap elections still play a role in the political debate as tools considered by political parties and the Executive branch to promote their agenda or to seize political momentum. No recall election is codified in electoral regulations.
The Italian President is not required to call for a snap election, even if the prime minister asks for it, provided that the Parliament is able to form a new working majority (President Oscar Luigi Scalfaro denied snap election to Prime Minister Silvio Berlusconi after the loss of confidence in 1994).

Luxembourg
Early general elections were held in Luxembourg on 20 October 2013. The elections were called after Prime Minister Jean-Claude Juncker, at the time the longest serving head of government in the European Union, announced his resignation over a spy scandal involving the Service de Renseignement de l'Etat (SREL). The review found Juncker deficient in his control over the service.

After a spy scandal involving the SREL illegally wiretapping politicians, the Grand Duke and his family, and allegations of paying for favours in exchange for access to government ministers and officials leaked through the press, Prime Minister Juncker submitted his resignation to the Grand Duke on 11 July 2013, upon knowledge of the withdrawal of the Luxembourg Socialist Workers' Party from the government and thereby losing its confidence and supply in the Chamber of Deputies. Juncker urged the Grand Duke for the immediate dissolution of parliament and the calling of a snap election.

Romania
In Romania, under the 1993 constitution, according the article 89, the President of Romania can dissolve the Parliament of Romania if a government has not been formed in 60 days and two proposals for Prime Minister have been refused.

Russia
In Russia, under the 1993 constitution, according the article 109, while the State Duma (lower house of the Federal Assembly) is elected for a five-year term, but the president has the authority to dissolve the State Duma and call a snap election. However, this possibility of the president is limited, and he can use it only in two cases: if the State Duma three times in a row refused to approve the prime minister, or twice in three months pass a motion of no confidence against the Government of Russia.

2016 legislative election de facto were snap, as they were held three months ahead of schedule. However, the early holding of election was not due to the dissolution of the State Duma, but to the postponement of the day of voting on the day on which the regional elections were held. The early elections were approved by the Constitutional Court.

Slovakia
A snap general election took place in Slovakia on 10 March 2012 to elect 150 members of the Národná rada. The election followed the fall of Prime Minister Iveta Radičová's Slovak Democratic and Christian Union – Democratic Party-led coalition in October 2011 over a no confidence vote her government had lost because of its support for the European Financial Stability Fund. Amidst a major corruption scandal involving local center-right politicians, former Prime Minister Robert Fico's Direction – Social Democracy won an absolute majority of seats.

Slovenia
A parliamentary election for the 90 deputies to the National Assembly of Slovenia was held on 4 December 2011. This was the first early election in Slovenia's history. 65.60% of voters cast their vote. The election was surprisingly won by the center-left Positive Slovenia party, led by Zoran Janković. However, he failed to be elected as the new prime minister in the National Assembly, and the new government was formed by a right-leaning coalition of five parties, led by Janez Janša, the president of the second-placed Slovenian Democratic Party.
the National Assembly consists of 90 members, elected for a four-year term, 88 members elected by the party-list proportional representation system with D'Hondt method and 2 members elected by ethnic minorities (Italians and Hungarians) using the Borda count.

The election was previously scheduled to take place in 2012, four years after the 2008 election. However, on 20 September 2011, the government led by Borut Pahor fell after a vote of no confidence.

As stated in the Constitution, the National Assembly has to elect a new prime minister within 30 days and a candidate has to be proposed by either members of the Assembly or the President of the country within seven days after the fall of a government. If this does not happen, the president dissolves the Assembly and calls for a snap election. The leaders of most parliamentary political parties expressed opinion that they preferred an early election instead of forming a new government.

As no candidates were proposed by the deadline, the President Danilo Türk announced that he would dissolve the Assembly on 21 October and that the election would take place on 4 December. The question arose as to whether the President could dissolve the Assembly after the seven days, in the event that no candidate was proposed. However, since this situation is not covered in the constitution, the decision of the President to wait the full 30 days was welcomed by the political parties. The dissolution of the Assembly, a first in independent Slovenia, took place on October 21, a minute after midnight.

Spain
2011 general election: The Cortes Generales were dissolved and the general election called by King Juan Carlos I on 26 September, at the request of Prime Minister José Luis Rodríguez Zapatero, who had already announced his intention to call for a snap election on 28 July.
2016 general election: After no party secured a majority in the 2015 general election and with ensuing negotiations leading to political deadlock, a fresh election was called for 26 June—the first time in Spanish recent history that an election was triggered as a result of failure in the government formation process.

Sweden
The Instrument of Government (Regeringsformen) in the Constitution of Sweden allows an "extra election" ("extra val" in Swedish). The wording is used to make clear it does not change the period to the next ordinary election, and the Members of Parliament elected merely serve out what remains of the four-year parliamentary term.

Elections are called by the government. Elections are also to be held if the parliament fails four times to elect a prime minister.
Elections may not otherwise be called during the first three months of the Riksdag's first session after a general election. Elections may not be called by a prime minister who has resigned or been discharged. 
 2014 Swedish government crisis: On 3 December 2014, Prime Minister Stefan Löfven announced that the government was calling for a snap election on 22 March 2015, after the parliament elected on 14 September 2014 voted against the government's proposal for the 2015 state budget. However, the final order of the snap election was never carried out as six out of the eight parliament parties reached an agreement on 27 December 2014 called Decemberöverenskommelsen (The December Agreement). The agreement was dissolved in 2015.

Ukraine
In Ukraine a snap poll must have a voter turnout higher than 50%. A snap election was most recently held with the 2019 Ukrainian parliamentary election held after President Volodymyr Zelenskyy dissolved the Verkhovna Rada shortly after his inauguration to win a parliamentary majority for his Servant of the People party.

United Kingdom
The prime minister of the United Kingdom has the de facto power to call an election at will by requesting a dissolution from the monarch – the limited circumstances where this would not be granted are set out in the Lascelles Principles.

Fixed-term Parliaments Act 
From 2011 to 2022, the conditions for when a snap election could be called were significantly restricted by the Fixed-term Parliaments Act 2011 (FTPA) to occasions when the government loses a confidence motion or when a two-thirds supermajority of MPs vote in favour. During autumn 2019 there were three attempts to trigger an election through the FTPA's provision for a two-thirds majority: all failed. Then the FTPA was bypassed entirely by Parliament enacting the Early Parliamentary General Election Act 2019 stipulating a set date for the next election: the 2019 United Kingdom general election. This required only a simple majority, because of the doctrine of parliamentary supremacy: Parliament cannot pass a law that cannot be changed or reversed by a future Parliament. The Fixed-term Parliaments Act was repealed on March 24, 2022 by the Dissolution and Calling of Parliament Act 2022, which restored the Monarch's power to dissolve parliament on request by the Prime Minister. This is thought to have revived the Lascelles Principles as well.

History 
The following elections were called by a voluntary decision of the government less than four years after the previous election:
1923 general election: Although the Conservative Party had won a working majority in the House of Commons after Bonar Law's victory in the 1922 general election, Stanley Baldwin called an election only a year later. Baldwin sought a mandate to raise tariffs, which Law had promised against in the previous election, as well as desiring to gain a personal mandate to govern and strengthen his position within the party. This backfired, as the election resulted in a hung parliament. After losing a confidence motion in January 1924, Baldwin resigned and was replaced by Ramsay MacDonald, who formed the country's first ever Labour minority government with tacit support from the Liberal Party.
1931 general election: After his government split over how to deal with the Great Depression, Ramsay MacDonald offered his resignation to the King in August 1931. He was instead persuaded to form a National Government with the Conservatives and Liberals, which resulted in his expulsion from the Labour Party. The Cabinet then decided to call the election to obtain a Doctor's Mandate to fix the economy. The result was that the National Government won the biggest landslide in British history. Labour, which was blamed for running away from responsibility as a Government in the nation's hour of need, was reduced to just 52 seats and its leader, Arthur Henderson, lost his seat.
1951 general election: Despite the fact the Conservatives were leading in the polls, Clement Attlee called the election to increase his government's majority, which had been reduced to just five seats in the previous general election. The Labour Party was defeated and Winston Churchill returned to power with a majority of 17.
1955 general election: After Winston Churchill retired in April 1955, Anthony Eden took over and immediately called the election in order to gain a mandate for his government.
1966 general election: Harold Wilson called the election seventeen months after Labour narrowly won the 1964 general election: The government had won a barely-workable majority of four seats, which had been reduced to two after the Leyton by-election in January 1965. Labour won a decisive victory, with a majority of 98 seats.
February 1974 general election: Prime Minister Edward Heath called the election in order to get a mandate to face down a miners' strike. The election unexpectedly produced a hung parliament in which Labour narrowly won more seats, despite winning fewer votes than the Conservatives. Unable to form a coalition with the Liberals, Heath resigned and was replaced by Wilson.
October 1974 general election: Six months after the February election, Wilson called another general election in an attempt to win a majority for his Labour minority government and resolve the deadlock. Wilson was successful, though Labour only held a narrow 3-seat majority.

Gordon Brown came very close to calling a snap election in the autumn of 2007; after he failed to do this, his popularity and authority greatly declined and he lost power in 2010.

The following election was called by a vote in the House of Commons resulting in a two-thirds majority of MPs, under the terms of the Fixed-term Parliaments Act 2011:
In April 2017, Prime Minister Theresa May requested a general election which was approved in Parliament by a near-unanimous vote. This was shortly after the official commencement of the process of withdrawing from the European Union (Brexit), with May saying that she needed a clear mandate to lead the country through the ensuing negotiations, and hoping to increase her Conservative Party's majority. The 2017 general election was a failure for May, with the Conservative Party losing seats, resulting in a hung parliament and a minority Conservative government with a confidence and supply agreement with the Democratic Unionist Party.

The following elections were forced by a motion of no confidence against the will of the government:
1924 general election: Ramsay MacDonald was forced to call the election after a successful vote of no confidence as a result of the Campbell Case. It was the third general election in three years. The result was a landslide victory for Baldwin and the Conservatives.
1979 general election: This election was held six months before the latest possible date. It was called when the minority Labour government of James Callaghan lost a confidence motion, which had been proposed by the SNP in the aftermath of the Scottish devolution referendum and was taken forward by the Conservatives, by one vote. The Conservatives, led by Margaret Thatcher, won a majority of seats at the election.

Devolved governments
The devolved UK administrations (the Northern Ireland Assembly, Scottish Parliament, and Welsh Assembly; established in 1998, 1999, and 1998 respectively) are also elected for fixed terms of government (four years prior to 2011, five years thereafter), but snap elections can still be called in the event of a motion of no confidence, or other special circumstances.
2017 Northern Ireland Assembly election: Held ten months after the previous Assembly election. Following the resignation of Sinn Féin deputy First Minister Martin McGuinness over various issues and scandals with his party's DUP coalition partners, and the subsequent refusal of Sinn Féin to nominate a new deputy First Minister, the Northern Ireland Executive collapsed and the Secretary of State for Northern Ireland James Brokenshire was legally obliged to call a snap election to attempt to restore a functional devolved government. This election took place on 2 March 2017. The DUP and Sinn Féin remained the two largest parties following the election, but did not reach an agreement to share power until January 2020.

References

Elections